Mont Mallet is a mountain in the Mont Blanc massif in Haute-Savoie, France. It lies on a spur running northwards from the French-Italian frontier ridge, and can be most easily reached from the Aiguille de Rochefort.

Mont Mallet was first climbed on 4th September 1871. The first ascension party consisted of Leslie Stephen, Gabriel Loppé, F. Wallroth, Melchior Anderegg, Cachet and A. Tournier. They reached it via its southern ridge, a route now graded on the French adjectival climbing scale as PD. Its north ridge (graded AD) was first climbed in 1882.

References

External links
Mont Mallet on French IGN Geoportal

Mountains of the Alps
Alpine three-thousanders
Mountains of Haute-Savoie